David Patros (born 11 September 1977) is a retired French sprinter.

Born in Paris, he finished fifth in relay at the 2000 Summer Olympics, with teammates Frédéric Krantz, Christophe Cheval and Needy Guims. At the 2002 European Championships he finished fourth with teammates Issa-Aimé Nthépé, Jérôme Eyana and Ronald Pognon.

His personal best times were 10.13 seconds in the 100 m and 20.51 seconds in the 200 m, both achieved in July 2000.

References

1977 births
Living people
French male sprinters
Athletes (track and field) at the 2000 Summer Olympics
Olympic athletes of France
Athletes from Paris
20th-century French people
21st-century French people